Shreya Sharma  is an Indian child film actress. She lives in Shimla, Himachal Pradesh, India.

Filmography
She acted first at the age of 13 in film The Blue Umbrella.

Other
On the occasion of 125th birth year of popular Hindi writer Chandradhar Sharma ‘Guleri’, a special screening of the film Usne Kaha Tha based on one of his popular stories was held on 19 July 2008 in the capital city of Himachal Pradesh. Shreya Sharma narrated the story ahead of the screening, held at Auckland House School, Longwood.

References

External links
 
 

Living people
Indian film actresses
Actresses in Hindi cinema
Indian child actresses
Year of birth missing (living people)
Actresses from Himachal Pradesh